The Copa América is South America's major tournament in senior men's soccer and determines the continental champion. Until 1967, the tournament was known as South American Championship. It is the oldest continental championship in the world.

Honduras are not members of the South American football confederation CONMEBOL. But because CONMEBOL only has ten member associations, guest nations have regularly been invited since 1993.

In 2001, there were several problems with the planned Copa América and was even officially cancelled at one point. When plans of postponement to 2002 did not work out either, the tournament was held as scheduled. However, two teams withdrew: Invitees Canada had already disbanded the squad after the initial cancellation, and Argentina withdrew on the grounds that they were receiving death threats.

Costa Rica was quickly found as a substitute for Canada - and eventually Honduras agreed to substitute for Argentina. The announcement came on July 10, one day before the inaugural match, and three days before the first match of Hunduras. In spite of star players missing, they did well in that tournament, placing Third, and with Amado Guevara awarded as the tournament's MVP.

Honduras had won a continental title in the past: The CONCACAF Championship in 1981, a home tournament for them.

In 2016, the Copa América Centenario was a tournament co-hosted by CONCACAF and CONMEBOL and would have been Honduras' chance to play in a second Copa América, but they failed to qualify.

Record at the Copa América

* Draws include matches decided on penalties.

Squad

Notable absences

At the beginning of the 2001 Copa América, the final stage of the Honduran league system was still ongoing, and the involved clubs, Real España, Marathón, Olimpia and Platense, did not put their Honduran players up for national selection on such short notice and during the decisive phase of the season.

For that or similar reasons, several players were missing in the Honduran squad who held important roles at the 2000 CONCACAF Gold Cup one year prior. Carlos Pavón, Milton Núñez, José Pineda and Julio César de León were among those left out.

Match overview

Record players

Of the five players who were active in all six matches, Amado Guevara has played the most minutes. He was only substituted in the 90th minute of the last match.

Top goalscorers

See also

Honduras at the FIFA World Cup
Honduras at the CONCACAF Gold Cup

References

External links
RSSSF archives and results
Soccerway database

Countries at the Copa América
Honduras national football team